Saskia Garel (born December 9, 1969) is a Jamaican-Canadian musician and actress.

Biography

Garel was born in Kingston, Jamaica and immigrated to Toronto, Canada at an early age. With an avid interest in the arts, Saskia graduated from York University with a Bachelor of Fine Arts Honours degree and was awarded the Oscar Peterson Award.

Career

During her 4 years at York, she performed in the group Coconut Groove (top 40, Latin and world beat music) and played the Toronto nightclub circuit. It was with Coconut Groove that she was discovered by Richie Mayer and David Bendeth (A&R with BMG Music) and was signed to a record deal as a member of the group Love and Sas. This would launch her music career in a huge way as she went on to garner 2 Juno Awards for best R&B recording for "Call My Name" and "Once in a Lifetime" two years in a row off the same album. Love & Sas toured Canada, the US and the UK, had 3 top ten hits on the Canadian charts and had 5 music videos running in high rotation on Much Music. While shooting her music videos, Saskia was bitten by the acting bug and was able to combine her love of singing and her new found passion for acting in the realm of musical theatre. She garnered the role of Mimi, in the Canadian Production of the Pulitzer Prize winning Broadway show Rent. While on tour with Rent in Vancouver, Canada she landed the part of Jasmine on the TV series Nightman, where she starred as a singer in 10 episodes of their final season. Saskia endured the schedule of filming during the day and performing as Mimi at night.

Personal life

Garel is married to fellow actor Steven Allerick whom she met while playing Nala in The Lion King.

Filmography

Film

Television

References

External links

Official website

1969 births
Living people
Canadian television actresses
Canadian expatriates in the United States
Jamaican emigrants to Canada
Canadian actresses of Chinese descent
Musicians from Toronto
Actresses from Toronto
People from Kingston, Jamaica
Canadian people of Spanish descent